Vanchi  was a headquarters of Chera dynasty, who ruled central Kerala and western Tamil Nadu (the Kongu country) in the early historic south India. The exact location of Vanchi is matter of a debate among historians. It is speculated that the location was identical with medieval Vanchi Karur (modern Karur).

The following medieval Chera (Kerala) capitals were also known as "Vanchi".

 Vanchi Karur or Karuvur - present-day Karur (capital of the Kongu Cheras/Keralas)
 Kodungallur - Mahodaya-puram (Makotai) - Thiruvanchikkulam (capital of the Chera/Perumals)

References 

Ancient Indian cities
Former capital cities in India
Karur